Mosaïque is the fourth studio album by the Gipsy Kings, released in 1989 in Europe and Canada. The main difference between the two versions is the replacement of the instrumental "Bossamba" on the European release with "Niña morena" on the North American release. The track order also differs between the two versions, and they contain different recordings of the songs "Caminando por la calle", "Trista pena", and "Vamos a bailar".

"Viento del arena" is a studio album release from the song's appearance in Luna de fuego. It was sung in Turkish by Turkish folk singer Volkan Konak as "Lilalı Kız" ("Girl with lilac") in his third album, "Gelir Misin Benimle" ("Would You Like to Come with Me") in 1994.

European track listing

North American track listing

Certifications

References

External links
Mosaïque at Discogs
Mosaïque CANADA at Discogs
Mosaîque at gipsykings.net

1989 albums
Columbia Records albums
Elektra Records albums
Gipsy Kings albums